Bernie O'Neill (born 1945 in Adrigole, County Cork) is an Irish former sportsperson. He played Gaelic football with his local club Adrigole and was a member of the Cork senior inter-county team in the 1960s and 1970s.

Honours

Adrigole
Cork Intermediate Football Championship: 1979
Beara Junior Football Championship: 1962, 1966, 1968, 1970, 1971, 1972

Beara
Munster Senior Club Football Championship: 1967 (c)
Cork Senior Football Championship: 1967 

Cork
Munster Senior Football Championship: 1967, 1971, 1973
Munster Under-21 Football Championship: 1965

References

1945 births
Living people
Adrigole Gaelic footballers
Beara Gaelic footballers
Cork inter-county Gaelic footballers
Munster inter-provincial Gaelic footballers